Calling All Ma's is a 1937 British comedy film directed by Redd Davis and starring Billy Caryll, Hilda Mundy and Margaret Yarde. A henpecked husband attempts to escape from his domineering wife. The film was made at Wembley Studios by 20th Century Fox's British subsidiary, for release as a quota quickie.

Cast
 Billy Caryll as Billy Smith 
 Hilda Mundy as Hilda Smith 
 Margaret Yarde as Ma-in-Law 
 Anthony Shaw as Arthur Parkins 
 Julian Vedey as Italian 
 Charles Castella as Barman

References

Bibliography
 Chibnall, Steve. Quota Quickies: The British of the British 'B' Film. British Film Institute, 2007.
 Low, Rachael. Filmmaking in 1930s Britain. George Allen & Unwin, 1985.
 Wood, Linda. British Films, 1927-1939. British Film Institute, 1986.

External links

1937 films
British comedy films
British black-and-white films
1937 comedy films
Films directed by Redd Davis
Films shot at Wembley Studios
20th Century Fox films
Quota quickies
1930s English-language films
1930s British films